Harry's Hong Kong is a 1987 American TV film directed by Jerry London.

Cast
David Soul as Harry Petros
Mike Preston as Max Trumble
Mel Harris as Fay Salerno
Jan Gan Boyd as Sally Cheng
Lisa Lu as Rose
Julia Nickson as Mei Ling
James Hong as Mr Yu
Rosanna Huffman as Mrs Hamilton
David Hemmings as Jack Roarke
Russell Wong as Sergeant Lee
Robert Easton as American Tourist

Production
There was location filming in Hong Kong. Julia Nickson fell in love with David Soul during filming and they became engaged.

References

External links
Harry's Hong Kong at BFI
Harry's Hong Kong at TCMDB
Harry's Hong Kong at IMDb

1987 television films
1987 films
ABC network original films
Films directed by Jerry London
Films shot in Hong Kong